, also known as Wel City Tokyo, was a concert hall in Shinjuku, Tokyo, one of a number of public concert halls in Japan called Kōsei Nenkin Kaikan. John Coltrane's quintet performed here on their Japanese tour (1966). Dutch band Shocking Blue who were internationally famous after topping the US charts with their hit Venus, performed here in July, 1971. Parts of these concerts were used for their 'Live in Japan' - album of 1971. Journey also performed here on their Escape tour (1981).

Opened on 15 April 1961, the hall closed on March 31, 2010.

References 

Concert halls in Japan
Buildings and structures in Shinjuku
Buildings and structures completed in 1961